Ebacher is a surname. Notable people with the surname include:

Joseph P. Ebacher (1921–1974), American educator and founder of the Ebacher Method of foreign language learning
Roger Ébacher, current archbishop of the Roman Catholic Archdiocese of Gatineau